Rodewisch is a town in the Vogtlandkreis district, in the Free State of Saxony, Germany. It is situated 3 km north of Auerbach (Vogtland), and 20 km east of Plauen. Sputnik 1 was seen for the first time in the world in Rodewisch. Rodewisch was first mentioned in 1411 and has been a town since 1924. Today's town was formed in 1859 by the merger of the three districts of Obergöltzsch, Untergöltzsch and Niederauerbach. Rodewisch has two hospitals and a planetarium.  Until 1926 there was a large brass works in the town, which was the largest in northern Germany. Röthenbach and Rützengrün have belonged to Rodewisch since 1994 and 1992 respectively.

Demographics
Historical population:

Famous people born in Rodewisch
 Falko Götz (b. 1962), football player and manager
 Siegbert Hummel (1908–2001), Tibetologist and cultural historian
 Gerd Schädlich (1952–2022), football player and manager

References 

Towns in Saxony
Vogtlandkreis